The  is an inactive professional wrestling championship in the Japanese promotion DDT Pro-Wrestling. The title was established in 2009 during a match that took place in the Midbreath gym located in Yotsuya, Tokyo.

Title history

See also

DDT Pro-Wrestling
Professional wrestling in Japan

References

DDT Pro-Wrestling championships
World professional wrestling championships